Michael Elliot Glatze (born 1975) was the co-founder of Young Gay America and a former advocate for gay rights. He subsequently renounced homosexuality and became a conservative Christian.

Biography
Glatze was born in Tacoma, Washington. His mother was a non-denominational Christian and his father was agnostic. His father died of a heart condition when Glatze was 13, and his mother died when he was 19. Glatze earned a bachelor's degree from Dartmouth College where he majored in English literature and creative writing, with a minor in music.

While working at XY Magazine in San Francisco, Glatze met Benjie Nycum. Glatze and Nycum coauthored the book XY Survival Guide (2000). They later co-founded their own magazine, Young Gay America.

In 2003, Glatze starred in Jim in Bold, an LGBT-related film, with his then-partner Benjie.

In 2005, Glatze was quoted by Time magazine saying "I don't think the gay movement understands the extent to which the next generation just wants to be normal kids. The people who are getting that are the Christian right."

Glatze turned toward Christianity after a health scare due to palpitations. Worried that he was affected by the same heart condition which claimed his father's life, he sought medical help. The palpitations turned out to be due to anemia, caused by celiac disease. He joined the Church of Jesus Christ of Latter-day Saints in the first half of 2007 but left the church shortly thereafter.

He has received media coverage in other publications and in the book 16 Amazing Stories of Divine Intervention as well as several blogs. Glatze now serves as a pastor of a small Evangelical Protestant church in Yoder, Wyoming. His story is told in the 2015 independent film I Am Michael starring James Franco and Zachary Quinto and the short 2017 documentary Michael Lost and Found.

References

1975 births
Sexual orientation change efforts
Former Latter Day Saints
People from Tacoma, Washington
LGBT Latter Day Saints
Living people
People self-identified as ex-gay
American activists